The following highways are numbered 927:

Canada

Costa Rica
 National Route 927

United States